Hugh Lee (30 December 1955 – 2 July 2013) was a Taiwanese Golden Bell-award winning television actor and theatre director.

He founded the Ping-Fong Acting Troupe in 1986, but went on hiatus in December 2011 due to health concerns. Lee died of bowel cancer on 2 July 2013, at age 58. Following his death, Lee's wife Moon Wang ( (台灣藝人)) announced that Ping-Fong would close after its last scheduled performance in December 2013.

In total, 40 Hugh Lee plays were launched with 1,793 performances completed.  These were enjoyed by a cumulative 1.49 million audience members.

References

External links

2013 deaths
Taiwanese Buddhists
Taiwanese male television actors
Taiwanese theatre directors
1955 births
Deaths from colorectal cancer
Deaths from cancer in Taiwan
Male actors from Taipei